Mihelič is a surname. Notable people with the surname include:

France Mihelič (1907–1998), Slovene painter
Mira Mihelič (1912–1985), Slovene writer and translator
Rene Mihelič (born 1988), Slovene footballer

Slovene-language surnames